Guilford Press or Guilford Publications, Inc. is a New York City-based independent publisher founded in 1973 that specializes in publishing books, journals, and DVDs in psychology, psychiatry, the behavioral sciences, education, geography, and research methods.

Overview
Guilford was founded by Bob Matloff and Seymour Weingarten. Matloff retired as President in 2022, and the firm is now run by Weingarten (President and Editor-in-Chief) and Tim Stookesberry (Chief Executive Officer). 

Guilford Press has over 1,200 titles in print and typically publishes more than 55-65 new books in print and e-book formats each year. The company also publishes 1 newsletter and 9 journals. Guilford's workflow for accessible ePub e-books has been accredited as Global Certified Accessible, and they have begun to offer certified accessible ePubs meeting WCAG 2.0 AA standards.

In the academic sphere, Guilford Publications has published books by Aaron T. Beck, who is known as the father of cognitive therapy and was the winner of the 2006 Lasker Foundation Clinical Medical Research Award; Marsha Linehan, the developer of dialectical behavior therapy (DBT); and the founders of motivational interviewing, Stephen Rollnick and William R. Miller. Overcoming Binge Eating, Second Edition, by Christopher G. Fairburn, and Mind Over Mood by Dennis Greenberger and Christine A. Padesky, have been chosen for inclusion in the United Kingdom Reading Well Books on Prescription program, a selective list of self-help books that general practitioners, counselors, and community mental health specialists are encouraged to "prescribe" for patients with mild to moderate mental health concerns. Mind Over Mood was also voted by the British Association of Behavioural and Cognitive Therapies as "the most influential cognitive behavioural therapy publication" and was recommended by Scientific American Mind.

In the field of literacy education, Guilford has published books by leading scholars such as Isabel Beck and Margaret McKeown (whose books on vocabulary have sold over 500,000 copies), G. Michael Pressley, Kathy Ganske, Lesley Mandel Morrow, Susan B. Neuman, and Linda Gambrell. Among Guilford's authors and editors are 12 past presidents of the International Literacy Association, 44 members of the Reading Hall of Fame, and 14 winners of the Oscar S. Causey Award for lifetime contributions to literacy research from the Literacy Research Association.

Guilford titles are distributed in the UK, Europe, Israel, and Pakistan by Taylor & Francis and in Australia and New Zealand by Woodslane.

Guilford exhibits at numerous professional conferences each year, such as those held by the American Academy of Child and Adolescent Psychiatry, the American Educational Research Association, the American Psychiatric Association, the American Psychological Association, the Association for Behavioral and Cognitive Therapies, the Association of American Geographers, the International Literacy Association, the International Neuropsychological Society, and the National Association of School Psychologists.

The company's titles are regularly reviewed in prominent publications, including Choice Reviews; Doody's Review Service, which regularly includes Guilford titles in its Core Titles collection development tool for health science libraries; Library Journal; and Publishers Weekly.

Authors

Guilford's list of authors includes: Anita L. Archer, Russell A. Barkley, David H. Barlow, Roy F. Baumeister, Aaron T. Beck, Isabel L. Beck, Judith S. Beck, Lorna Smith Benjamin, Rachel Brown-Chidsey, Geraldine Dawson, Peg Dawson, Edward L. Deci, Peter Dicken, Glen H. Elder, Jr., Christopher G. Fairburn, Allen Frances, Kathy Ganske, Christopher K. Germer, Eliana Gil, Leslie S. Greenberg, Dennis Greenberger, Richard Guare, Robert D. Hare, Melanie S. Harned, Andrew F. Hayes, Steven C. Hayes, E. Tory Higgins, Kent Hoffman, Stefan G. Hofmann, David A. Jobes, Susan M. Johnson, Jon Kabat-Zinn, Douglas Kellner, David A. Kenny, Rex B. Kline, Diane Lapp, D. Richard Laws, Robert L. Leahy, Patricia Leavy, Michael Lewis, Marsha Linehan, Todd D. Little, Cathy A. Malchiodi, Michael C. McKenna, Margaret G. McKeown, Nancy McWilliams, David J. Miklowitz, William R. Miller, James R. Morrison, Lesley Mandel Morrow, Lisa M. Najavits, Kristin Neff, Susan B. Neuman, Christine A. Padesky, Michael Quinn Patton, Susan Pollak, Stephen Rollnick, Norman E. Rosenthal, Richard M. Ryan, Zindel Segal, Francine Shapiro, Daniel J. Siegel, Louise Spear-Swerling, Ronald D. Siegel, Robert E. Stake, John D. Teasdale, Bessel van der Kolk, Sharon Walpole, Barent Walsh, Froma Walsh, J. Mark G. Williams, Charles H. Zeanah, Edward L. Zuckerman, among many others.

References

Further reading
 
 
 
 

Publishing companies of the United States
Companies based in New York (state)
Educational publishing companies
Publishing companies established in 1973